This is a list of mayors of Bend, Oregon. The City of Bend was incorporated in 1904 and the first election for city leaders was held that year. The first mayor, Arthur L. Goodwillie, took office on January 4, 1905. Mayors were elected until Bend's charter was changed in 1928 following controversies sparked under the term of E.D. Gilson. The modified charter called for city councilors to appoint one member of the council to serve as mayor for a two-year term. The 1928 charter also moved Bend to a council–manager form of government, where the mayor leads city council while a city manager oversees day-to-day city operations. In May 2018, Bend voters approved charter amendments bringing back the direct election of the mayor.

Bend's mayors currently serve four-year terms and are directly elected by voters. The next election for mayor will be November 2026. The office is nonpartisan, meaning there is not a primary election or partisan affiliation on the ballot.

List

See also
 List of mayors of places in Oregon

References

Bend, Oregon
Bend, Oregon